Culdaff is a village on the Inishowen peninsula of County Donegal, Ireland. Known for its beach, it attracts tourists from all over Ireland. , the population was 237.

The present village dates back to the 8th century and was originally the site of the monastery of St Buadán (Baithéne mac Brénaind), after which the Church of Ireland is named. William Lawson Micks and Samuel Arnold Lawson, acted as Trustees for one hundred acres of bogland at Meenawarra near Culdaff on behalf of the purchaser, Jane Leferre.

Culdaff Beach
Culdaff beach is only about 50 yards away from the village. It includes two beaches, 'the small beach' and 'the big beach'. The beach can be very busy during the summer, and is known for the expansive sand on the main beach, and a large area of rocks around the second and further along the coastline.

Fishing
The Bunagee Pier is the mooring for two boats that take anglers out to fish, the Barracuda and the Gemini. Fish caught offshore include White Pollock, Black Pollock, Plaice, Rock Salmon, Sea Trout, and Salmon. Shell Fish include Brown Crab, Lobster, Green Crab, and Velvet Crab.

Sport

The main sport in Culdaff is football and the team is part of the Jackie Crossan Premier Division of the Inishowen Football League. Their home ground, Caratra Park, is next to the beach.

Places of interest
Ancient monuments in the area (located near the Bocan chapel) include the Carrowmore High Crosses, the Cloncha Cross, the Bocan Stone Circle and the Temple of Deen (a ruined court tomb). Other sights include St. Bodans Rock (located below the Bridge), and the site of old St Bodans well (located behind the Church of Ireland),

Notable people
 Charles Macklin (1699–1797), actor and dramatist
 Frederick Young (1786–1874), soldier

References

Further reading
 Peter Harbison, Guide to National and Historic Monuments of Ireland, Dublin, Gill & Macmillan, 1992, ; pp. 96–97
 Lou Callan et al., Ireland; 5th ed. London, Lonely Planet, 2002 ; pp. 599–600

External links
 https://web.archive.org/web/20080704184139/http://www.visitinishowen.com/tour/culdafftour.html

Towns and villages in County Donegal